Puszka Pandory (English: Pandora's Box) is a Polish computer text game created in 1986 by :pl:Marcin Borkowski for the ZX Spectrum computer. The game achieved popularity after trading on the Grzybowska Commodity Exchange (including trade from a lot of pirates, which were rampant in the country at the time due to a Communist approach to copyright).

The first version of the game was written in BASIC, and was wiped after the tape was accidentally placed into a tape recorder. Borkowski lost enthusiasm for the game and didn't have a second attempt. He returned to the project in 1986 when house sitting for a friend.

The text compression on the ZX Spectrum computer (due to the fact that it only had 48 kilobytes of memory) imposed many restrictions on programmers, and the game was created as a challenge to see if these restrictions could be bypassed.

According to the book Polish Bytes, the game is the first one written by a Pole, attempted to be sold in Poland, and whose description appeared in the Polish press. Bajtek's review of the game is notable for being the first extensive description of a Polish video game in the media. However, Borkowski actually wrote the review himself, under the anagram pseudonym "Karol B. Mirowski".

Legacy
On the game's 25th anniversary, 100 limited edition copies were released at the Poznań Game Arena, with each copy signed by Marcin Borkowski. The games worked on the ZX Spectrum.

References 

1980s interactive fiction
1986 video games
Adventure games
Video games developed in Poland
ZX Spectrum games
ZX Spectrum-only games